James Edmund Burke (April 23, 1849 – May 4, 1943) was an American politician who served as the 18th, 20th, 22nd, and 27th Mayor of Burlington, Vermont. Burke was the last third-party mayor of Burlington until 1981 when the Independent democratic socialist Bernie Sanders was elected, who was then succeeded by Progressives Peter A. Clavelle and Bob Kiss.

Life

James Edmund Burke was born April 23, 1849, in Williston, Vermont to Irish immigrants James and Ann Burke and was named after Irish politician Edmund Burke. In 1870 he married Sarah Roakes and on May 18, 1873, Burke came to Burlington.

Burke became involved in politics in the 1880s, and in the mid-1890s became involved in the Populist movement having been a Republican previously. He became involved in Burlington's city affairs under Democratic mayor Elliot M. Sutton from 1898 to 1900. In 1902 he ran for Vermont Secretary of State, and was the Democratic nominee for Governor of Vermont in 1908. In 1900 he made his first attempt for Burlington's mayoralty, but was defeated by incumbent Robert Roberts. In 1902 he ran for mayor against incumbent Mayor Donly C. Hawley and was defeated in a landslide along with the rest of the city Democrats.

In 1903 he ran against Hawley again and was initially defeated by three votes, but after a recount and a ruling by the state supreme court Burke was declared as the winner in May. During his first term as mayor, Burke suspended the chief of police and launched an investigation into the police department, oversaw the establishment of the city's electric department and completion of the electrical infrastructure construction. He was easily reelected in 1904 against R. E. Brown with 1,965 votes to 1,495 votes.

In 1900 and 1902 he was selected as one of Burlington's delegates to the Vermont Democratic state convention, in 1904 he served as a delegate to the Democratic National Convention. In 1912 and 1924 he ran to be a Progressive National Committee Delegate and presidential elector for Theodore Roosevelt and Robert M. La Follette and in 1932 he ran to be a Democratic presidential elector for nominee Franklin D. Roosevelt.

In 1929 he ran for mayor of Burlington and was defeated in a landslide by former mayor John Holmes Jackson with 3,425 votes to 2,354 votes. During the 1933 Burlington mayoral election incumbent Mayor Jackson chose not to run for reelection and endorsed Burke. In his 4th term he oversaw the creation of what would become the Burlington International Airport; in 1934, during his 5th term, he presented to Amelia Earhart the keys to the city at the airport.

On May 4, 1943, Burke died in Burlington after a short illness and was buried at the Saint Joseph Cemetery in Burlington.

Electoral history

References

|-

|-

|-

|-

|-

|-

Mayors of Burlington, Vermont
Progressive Party (United States, 1912) politicians
Vermont Populists
Vermont Democrats
Vermont Republicans
People from Williston, Vermont
People from Burlington, Vermont
1849 births
1943 deaths